Mónica Vergara Rubio (born 2 May 1983) is a Mexican professional football manager. Vergara is the former manager of the Mexico women's national football team. Before her manager career, Vergara was a member of the senior Mexico women's team, playing as a defender. Vergara also held positions as manager for the U-15, U-17, and U-20 Mexico women's national teams, leading the U-15 squad to a third-place finish at the Youth Olympic Games and, most notably, leading the U-17 team to the championship game of the 2018 FIFA U-17 Women's World Cup.

International career
Vergara represented Mexico at the senior level, competing at the 2004 Summer Olympics in Athens, Greece, where the team finished in eighth place.

Managerial career

Mexico U-15 women's national football team 
On August 26, 2014, Vergara led the Mexico U-15 women's national team to a bronze medal at the 2014 Summer Youth Olympic Games after beating Slovakia 3–1 in the third-place match. Three days prior, Mexico fell to Venezuela in penalty kicks, 3–4, after the game ended in a draw, 1-1.

Mexico U-17 women's national football team 
On June 12, 2018, Mexico U-17 women's national football team finished as Runners-up at the 2018 CONCACAF Women's U-17 Championship.

On December 1, 2018, Mexico U-17 women's national football team finished as Runners-up at the 2018 FIFA U-17 Women's World Cup, falling to Spain in the Final, 1–2.

Mexico U-20 women's national football team 
On March 8, 2020, Mexico U-20 women's national football team finished as Runners-up at the 2020 CONCACAF Women's U-20 Championship. With this result, the team qualified for the 2020 FIFA U-20 Women's World Cup, which was later postponed to 2021 and eventually canceled due to the COVID-19 pandemic.

Mexico senior women's national football team 
Vergara was named head coach of the senior team on January 19, 2021. She was sacked on August 15, 2022, after Mexico failed to qualify to the 2023 FIFA Women's World Cup during the  2022 CONCACAF W Championship.

Honors

Manager 
Mexico U-15 women's national football team
 Youth Olympic Games: Third-Place (2014)

Mexico U-17 women's national football team
 CONCACAF Women's U-17 Championship: Runners-up (2018)
 FIFA U-17 Women's World Cup: Runners-up (2018)

Mexico U-20 women's national football team
CONCACAF Women's U-20 Championship: Runners-up (2020)

References

External links
 
 Sports-reference profile

1983 births
Living people
Footballers from Guadalajara, Jalisco
Mexican football managers
Mexican women's footballers
Women's association football defenders
Mexico women's international footballers
1999 FIFA Women's World Cup players
Footballers at the 2004 Summer Olympics
Olympic footballers of Mexico
Footballers at the 2011 Pan American Games
Pan American Games medalists in football
Pan American Games bronze medalists for Mexico
Medalists at the 2011 Pan American Games
Mexico women's national football team managers
Mexican footballers